Jews have lived in Ireland for centuries. Notable individuals from the community include:

Lenny Abrahamson, Irish film director
Leonard Abrahamson (1896–1961), Gaelic scholar, who switched to medicine and became a professor, was born in Russia, grew up in Newry where he attended the local Christian Brothers school and lodged with the Nurock family in Dublin while studying at Trinity College Dublin
Max Abrahamson, lawyer; author of "Engineering Law and the ICE(Institute of Civil Engineers) Contract" which became known worldwide as "the engineers' bible"
William Annyas (Ãnes), Mayor of Youghal (1555) a Marrano merchant
Francis Annyas (Ãnes), Mayor of Youghal in 1569, 1576 and 1581, Youghal garrison commander and a spy for Francis Drake
Philip Baker(1880–1932), Irish Chess champion in 1924, 1927, 1928, and 1929
Justice Henry Barron, Irish Supreme Court judge 1997-2003
Leopold Bloom, fictional protagonist of Ulysses
Louis Bookman (1890–1943), Irish international soccer and cricket player
Michael Noyk, Irish Republican and solicitor during the Irish War of Independence
Robert Briscoe, member of the Irish Republican Army during the Anglo-Irish War and twice Lord Mayor of Dublin (1956 and 1961)
Ben Briscoe (son of Robert Briscoe), former Fianna Fáil T.D. and Lord Mayor of Dublin (1988)
Joe Briscoe (son of Robert Briscoe), member of the Jewish Representative Council (predating Israeli Embassy) and Commandant in the Irish Army
Michelle Citron, feminist film, video and multimedia producer, scholar and author
Max Eager (son of George Eager), first Chief Rabbi of Ireland
Elaine Feldman (1916–2006), co-founder of the first secondary school for the Jewish community in Dublin
Maurice Freeman (1875–1951), Mayor of Johannesburg 1934/35
Bob Geldof, singer-songwriter, actor and activist had a Jewish grandmother
Gerald Goldberg, Lord Mayor of Cork in 1977
Rabbi Yitzhak HaLevi Herzog, Chief Rabbi of Ireland from 1919 to 1937, later of the British Mandate of Palestine and Israel
Chaim Herzog, sixth President of Israel and British World War II veteran.  During and after his service in the British Army, he was also known as "Vivian Herzog" ("Vivian" being the English equivalent of the Hebrew name "Chaim")
 George Hook, broadcaster, journalist and rugby union pundit and coach
 Amy Huberman and Mark Huberman, actress and actor; their father was a Polish Jew
Sir Otto Jaffe, Lord Mayor of Belfast (1899 and 1904)
Immanuel Jakobovits, Chief Rabbi of Ireland between 1949 and 1958, later British Chief Rabbi
Harry Kernoff, painter (1900–1974)
Louis Lentin, director (documentary films, television, theatre)
Ronit Lentin, Head of Sociology, the director of the MPhil in Race, Ethnicity, Conflict, Department of Sociology and founder member of the Trinity Immigration Initiative, Trinity College, Dublin
Con Leventhal (1896–1979), lecturer, essayist, and critic
June Levine, feminist, journalist and writer
Maurice Levitas (1917–2001), (born Dublin) was an anti-fascist who took part in the Battle of Cable Street and  fought in the International Brigades during the Spanish Civil War, and the father of Ruth Levitas
David Marcus (1924–2009), author, editor, broadcaster and lifelong supporter of Irish-language fiction
David Marcus, author and professor of Bible and ancient languages at The Jewish Theological Seminary
Louis Marcus, documentary filmmaker
Max Nurock, Israeli Consul-General to Australia, subsequently Israel's first Ambassador to Australia
Yaakov Pearlman, Ireland's Chief Rabbi
David Ricardo, represented Portarlington (UK Parliament constituency) 1819-1823
Alan Shatter, former Fine Gael TD for Dublin South and formerly Minister for Justice and Equality and Minister for Defence
Bethal Solomons (1885–1965), medical Doctor, Master of the Rotunda, Irish Rugby International
Estella Solomons (1882–1968), landscape and portrait artist and member of Cumann na mBan
Stella Steyn (1907–1987), Dublin-born artist
Mervyn Taylor, former Labour Party T.D. and Minister for Equality and Law Reform
Abraham Weeks (or Abraham Wix) was the first person killed during 1916 Easter Rising (A Jewish comrade who joined on Easter Monday and died in action), he joined the Irish Citizen Army and was assigned to the GPO
District Judge Hubert Wine, family court judge and prominent member of Dublin's Jewish community

References

 
Jews
Ireland